The Chiriqui foliage-gleaner (Automolus exsertus) is a species of bird in the family Furnariidae.

It is found southwestern Costa Rica to western Panama. Its natural habitats are subtropical or tropical moist lowland forest and subtropical or tropical swampland.

This species was formerly considered as a subspecies of the buff-throated foliage-gleaner (Automolus ochrolaemus). It was promoted to species status based on the significant difference in the vocalisation and mitochrondrial DNA.

References

External links 

 Chiriqui foliage-gleaner at the Cornell Lab of Ornithology

Chiriqui foliage-gleaner
Birds of Central America
Chiriqui foliage-gleaner